Reading to Plymouth line may refer to:

Reading to Taunton line
Bristol to Exeter line
Exeter to Plymouth line